Navab Nassirshalal (also spelled Nasirshelal, ; born 1 April 1989) is an Iranian retired weightlifter who won a gold medal in the men's 105 kg event at the 2012 Summer Olympics. He began weightlifting at the age of 15 and has also won a bronze medal in the 94 kg class snatch at the 2007 Asian Weightlifting Championships, silver in the 94 kg clean and jerk and bronze overall at the 2009 edition, and gold in the 105 kg category in 2012 (after Oleksiy Torokhtiy was subsequently disqualified in 2019).

Early life
Nassirshalal was born on April 1, 1989 in Ahvaz and raised in Masjed Soleyman in the Khuzestan Province of Iran. He started weightlifting because of his father at the age of 15, out of the National Iranian Oil Company club in the oil-rich city of Masjed Soleyman. As of 2012 he was studying physical education at the Islamic Azad University Masjed Soleyman Branch and was coached by Kourosh Bagheri of the Iranian national team, a two-time Asian and 2001 World Champion in the 94 kg division. He is a member of Melli Haffari Company Ahvaz Sports Club.

Career
Nassirshalal made his international debut at the 2006 World Junior Weightlifting Championships in the 94 kg category, where he placed fifth. He earned two bronze medals at the 2007 edition, as well as silver at the 2007 Asian Junior Weightlifting Championships. He also competed at the Asian Championships senior level that year, winning bronze in the 94 kg class snatch. He won another bronze medal at the 2008 World Junior Championship before advancing permanently to the senior division in 2009, where he took silver in the 94 kg clean and jerk and bronze overall at the 2009 Asian Weightlifting Championships. After skipping the 2010 season and switching to the 105 kg division, he next appeared at the 2011 World Weightlifting Championships, placing sixth overall. He won his first international gold medal at the 2012 Asian Weightlifting Championships in the 105 kg snatch category. A technical error in the clean and jerk portion, however, left him out of contention for any more medals at this tournament. He was then selected to compete at the 2012 Summer Olympics in London where, despite competing with an aching knee, he won a silver medal in the 105 kg division, behind Oleksiy Torokhtiy of Ukraine, but later upgraded to the gold medal position following Torokhtiy's disqualification for doping. He participated in the same event at the 2014 Asian Games and the 2015 World Championships, but failed to set a mark in the clean and jerk in both cases.

Major results

References

External links 

 
 
 

1989 births
Living people
Iranian male weightlifters
Olympic weightlifters of Iran
Olympic gold medalists for Iran
Weightlifters at the 2012 Summer Olympics
Olympic medalists in weightlifting
Medalists at the 2012 Summer Olympics
Weightlifters at the 2014 Asian Games
People from Ahvaz
Melli Haffari club sportspeople
Asian Games competitors for Iran
Sportspeople from Khuzestan province
20th-century Iranian people
21st-century Iranian people